Umbar: Haven of the Corsairs is a 1982 fantasy role-playing game supplement published by Iron Crown Enterprises.

Contents
Umbar was the second detailed area module in Iron Crown's Middle-Earth series after Angmar, and focuses on the infamous pirate city that Aragorn conquered at the end of the Third Age.

Reception
William A. Barton reviewed Umbar in The Space Gamer No. 61. Barton commented that "Umbar is quite worth the price if you're looking for a place for fantasy adventures that has the flavor of Middle-Earth, yet is far enough from the occurrences of the books to leave plenty of room for independent action."

Jonathan Sutherland reviewed the Umbar - Haven of the Corsairs for White Dwarf #50, giving it an overall rating of 7 out of 10, and stated that "Covered in a most impressive manner are the full plans of the city together with the sewers, water supply, house plans, taverns, military structures, all those who live in them; the numerous Guilds, smugglers, City Guard, religions, ships and the sailors who frequent the city."

References

Middle-earth Role Playing supplements
Role-playing game supplements introduced in 1982